Confia em Mim is a 2014 Brazilian thriller film directed by Michel Tikhomiroff. It is the first feature film directed by  Tikhomiroff.

Plot
Mari, a promising chef, works hard to save her economies to open her own restaurant. Recently separated she now engages with Caio, an investor who will help her to realize her dream. However things won't be easy as she thinks.

Cast 
 Mateus Solano as Caio 
 Fernanda Machado as Mari
 Bruno Giordano as Vicente 
 Fernanda D'Umbra as Teresa

References

External links
 

Brazilian thriller films
2014 thriller films
2014 films
2014 directorial debut films